The root-mean-square deviation (RMSD) or root-mean-square error (RMSE) is a frequently used measure of the differences between values (sample or population values) predicted by a model or an estimator and the values observed. The RMSD represents the square root of the second sample moment of the differences between predicted values and observed values or the quadratic mean of these differences. These deviations are called residuals when the calculations are performed over the data sample that was used for estimation and are called errors (or prediction errors) when computed out-of-sample. The RMSD serves to aggregate the magnitudes of the errors in predictions for various data points into a single measure of predictive power. RMSD is a measure of accuracy, to compare forecasting errors of different models for a particular dataset and not between datasets, as it is scale-dependent.

RMSD is always non-negative, and a value of 0 (almost never achieved in practice) would indicate a perfect fit to the data. In general, a lower RMSD is better than a higher one. However, comparisons across different types of data would be invalid because the measure is dependent on the scale of the numbers used.

RMSD is the square root of the average of squared errors. The effect of each error on RMSD is proportional to the size of the squared error; thus larger errors have a disproportionately large effect on RMSD. Consequently, RMSD is sensitive to outliers.

Formula 

The RMSD of an estimator  with respect to an estimated parameter  is defined as the square root of the mean squared error:

For an unbiased estimator, the RMSD is the square root of the variance, known as the standard deviation.

The RMSD of predicted values  for times t of a regression's dependent variable  with variables observed over T times, is computed for T different predictions as the square root of the mean of the squares of the deviations:

(For regressions on cross-sectional data, the subscript t is replaced by i and T is replaced by n.)

In some disciplines, the RMSD is used to compare differences between two things that may vary, neither of which is accepted as the "standard".
the formula becomes

Normalization
Normalizing the RMSD facilitates the comparison between datasets or models with different scales. Though there is no consistent means of normalization in the literature, common choices are the mean or the range (defined as the maximum value minus the minimum value) of the measured data:

This value is commonly referred to as the normalized root-mean-square deviation or error (NRMSD or NRMSE), and often expressed as a percentage, where lower values indicate less residual variance. In many cases, especially for smaller samples, the sample range is likely to be affected by the size of sample which would hamper comparisons.

Another possible method to make the RMSD a more useful comparison measure is to divide the RMSD by the interquartile range. When dividing the RMSD with the IQR the normalized value gets less sensitive for extreme values in the target variable.

  where 

When normalizing by the mean value of the measurements, the term coefficient of variation of the RMSD, CV(RMSD) may be used to avoid ambiguity. This is analogous to the coefficient of variation with the RMSD taking the place of the standard deviation.

Mean absolute error 
Some researchers have recommended the use of the Mean Absolute Error (MAE) instead of the Root Mean Square Deviation. MAE possesses advantages in interpretability over RMSD. MAE is the average of the absolute values of the errors. MAE is fundamentally easier to understand than the square root of the average of squared errors. Furthermore, each error influences MAE in direct proportion to the absolute value of the error, which is not the case for RMSD.

Applications
In meteorology, to see how effectively a mathematical model predicts the behavior of the atmosphere.
In bioinformatics, the root-mean-square deviation of atomic positions is the measure of the average distance between the atoms of superimposed proteins.
In structure based drug design, the RMSD is a measure of the difference between a crystal conformation of the ligand conformation and a docking prediction.
In economics, the RMSD is used to determine whether an economic model fits economic indicators. Some experts have argued that RMSD is less reliable than Relative Absolute Error.
In experimental psychology, the RMSD is used to assess how well mathematical or computational models of behavior explain the empirically observed behavior.
In GIS, the RMSD is one measure used to assess the accuracy of spatial analysis and remote sensing.
In hydrogeology, RMSD and NRMSD are used to evaluate the calibration of a groundwater model.
In imaging science, the RMSD is part of the peak signal-to-noise ratio, a measure used to assess how well a method to reconstruct an image performs relative to the original image.
In computational neuroscience, the RMSD is used to assess how well a system learns a given model.
In protein nuclear magnetic resonance spectroscopy, the RMSD is used as a measure to estimate the quality of the obtained bundle of structures.
Submissions for the Netflix Prize were judged using the RMSD from the test dataset's undisclosed "true" values.
In the simulation of energy consumption of buildings, the RMSE and CV(RMSE) are used to calibrate models to measured building performance.
In X-ray crystallography, RMSD (and RMSZ) is used to measure the deviation of the molecular internal coordinates deviate from the restraints library values.
In control theory, the RMSE is used as a quality measure to evaluate the performance of a State observer.

See also
Root mean square
Mean absolute error
Average absolute deviation
Mean signed deviation
Mean squared deviation
Squared deviations
Errors and residuals in statistics

References

Point estimation performance
Statistical deviation and dispersion